FC Chomutov is a football club located in Chomutov, Czech Republic. It currently plays in the Czech Fourth Division.

In the 2000–01, 2001–02 and 2002–03 seasons, the club played in the Czech 2. Liga.

In September 2011, head coach Jiří Černý was sacked following a staggering 12–1 defeat away at Mladá Boleslav B in the Bohemian Football League.

Honours
Bohemian Football League (third tier)
 Champions 1999–2000

References

External links
 

Football clubs in the Czech Republic
Association football clubs established in 1920
Sport in Chomutov
1920 establishments in Czechoslovakia